Alexander Vinokourov or Alexander Vinokurov may refer to the following people:

 Alexander Vinokourov (born 1973), Kazakh bicycle racer
 Alexander Vinokurov (politician) (1869–1944), Soviet politician
 Alexander Vinokurov (businessman) (born 1982), Russian businessman